Tikaderia is a genus of  funnel weavers containing the single species, Tikaderia psechrina.

References

External links

Agelenidae
Monotypic Araneomorphae genera
Spiders of Asia
Taxa named by Pekka T. Lehtinen